The Ruamahanga River runs through the southeastern North Island of New Zealand.

The river's headwaters are in the Tararua Range northwest of Masterton. From there it runs firstly south and then southwest for  before emptying into the Cook Strait. The towns of Masterton and Martinborough are close to the banks of the river. It is joined by many other rivers, including the Tauweru River near Gladstone.

In its lower reaches, the river meanders across a large floodplain, culminating in the wetlands around the edges of Lake Wairarapa. The river once flowed into the lake, but has now been diverted. The river drains at Palliser Bay  further south.

The river has now become generally polluted from sewage and farming that prevents people from swimming in the river or its tributaries.

References

Rivers of the Wellington Region
Rivers of New Zealand